Maer may refer to:

 Maer, Cornwall

 Maer, Staffordshire
 the location of Maer Hall, home of the pottery manufacturer Josiah Wedgwood II.
 Maer (office), an administrative position in medieval Wales, Scotland, and Ireland

See also
 Maerdy, a village in Wales